The 1889–90 season was the 19th season of competitive football in England. Preston North End were Football League champions for the second successive season while The Wednesday finished top of the newly formed Football Alliance. Blackburn Rovers won the FA Cup.

Football League

Football Alliance

A new competition, the Football Alliance, started this season.  It was formed by 12 clubs as a rival to The Football League, which had begun in the 1888–89 season, also with 12 member clubs. The Alliance covered a similar area to the League, stretching from the Midlands to the North West, but also further east in Sheffield, Grimsby and Sunderland.

FA Cup

The FA Cup was won by Blackburn Rovers, who beat The Wednesday 6–1 in the 1890 FA Cup Final to lift the trophy for the fourth time.

National team
In the 1889–90 British Home Championship, England played matches against Wales and Ireland on the same day, 15 March 1890, winning both comfortably. The team for the Wales match were mainly amateur players, whereas the team against Ireland were all professional players. The Irish goal was scored by Jack Reynolds, who later played for England.

In the deciding match against Scotland, the teams drew 1–1 and shared the trophy.

* England score given first

Key
 A = Away match
 BHC = British Home Championship

References

External links
Details of Wales v England game
Details of Ireland v England game
Details of Scotland v England game
British Home Championship results on RSSF